Kavir Buzurg, meaning Great Kavir (great salt marsh), lies in the center of the Dasht-e Kavir, which is a desert located in the middle of the Iranian plateau. The Kavir Buzurg covers an area of about 320 km by 160 km. It is separated from the neighboring kavirs by a surrounding ring of sandy hills. This is located in a rain shadow desert that receives little moisture. When water evaporates from the salt marshes, it creates crusts of salt that covers a dark saline mush. These crusts are easily penetrated by a traveler, making journeying across the kavir dangerous. This region is nearly uninhabited, with humans primarily dwelling on the surrounding hills and mountains.

References

Iranian Plateau
Salt flats